Andriy Volodymyrovych Khoma (born 23 September 2001) is a Ukrainian professional footballer who plays as a centre-forward for Ukrainian club Prykarpattia Ivano-Frankivsk.

References

External links
 Profile on Prykarpattia Ivano-Frankivsk official website
 
 

2001 births
Living people
Sportspeople from Ivano-Frankivsk
Ukrainian footballers
Association football forwards
FC Prykarpattia Ivano-Frankivsk (1998) players
Ukrainian First League players